Wormaldia moesta is a species of fingernet caddisfly in the family Philopotamidae.

References

Trichoptera
Articles created by Qbugbot
Insects described in 1914